Matthew Hutton may refer to:

Matthew Hutton (archbishop of York) (1529–1606), Archbishop of York
Matthew Hutton (MP) (1597–1666), English politician
Matthew Hutton (archbishop of Canterbury) (1693–1758), Archbishop of both York and later Canterbury